The Aurantimonadaceae are a small family of marine bacteria.

Notable Species
Aurantimonas coralicida causes a white plague in corals.

Fulvimarina pelagi was isolated from seawater, and takes the form of nonmotile rods. Fulvimarina pelagi is an obligate aerobe, and obtains its nourishment chemoheterotrophically. It tests positive for oxidase and catalase, and contains carotenoid pigments, possibly to protect against solar radiation.

Etymology
The name Aurantimonas derives from: New Latin aurantus, orange-coloured; Greek monas (μονάς), a unit; to mean an orange-coloured unicellular organism.

Members of the genus Aurantimonas can be referred to as aurantimonads (viz. trivialisation of names).

Phylogeny
The currently accepted taxonomy is based on the List of Prokaryotic names with Standing in Nomenclature (LPSN). The phylogeny is based on whole-genome analysis.

References 

Hyphomicrobiales